Ozawkie is a city in Jefferson County, Kansas, United States.  As of the 2020 census, the population of the city was 638.  Located adjacent to Perry Lake, Ozawkie formerly existed in a different location but was relocated without the aid of government funding prior to the reservoir's construction.

History
It was originally named Osawkee and became  Jefferson County's original county seat in 1855. The word Ozawkie is derived from the Sauk or Saukee Indians.

In 1930, there were rumors the US Army Corps of Engineers building a dam and relocation would be required.  However, it wasn't until 1954 that the Perry Dam Project was approved.  Since Ozawkie wasn't incorporated, the US Government would not relocate it.  Citizens came together to form a non-profit organization to help move Ozawkie.  In 1966, Ozawkie was relocated to higher ground west of the original town site and a water tower, school and 26 homes were built.

In 1967, the relocated Ozawkie was incorporated.

Geography
Ozawkie is located at  (39.233201, -95.465709).

Demographics

Ozawkie is part of the Topeka, Kansas Metropolitan Statistical Area.

2010 census
As of the census of 2010, there were 645 people, 231 households, and 195 families living in the city. The racial makeup of the city was 95.5% White, 0.6% African American, 1.4% Native American, 0.3% from other races, and 2.2% from two or more races. Hispanic or Latino of any race were 2.6% of the population.

There were 231 households, of which 39.8% had children under the age of 18 living with them, 70.6% were married couples living together, 10.0% had a female householder with no husband present, 3.9% had a male householder with no wife present, and 15.6% were non-families. 13.0% of all households were made up of individuals, and 6.5% had someone living alone who was 65 years of age or older. The average household size was 2.79 and the average family size was 3.02.

The median age in the city was 37.5 years. 28.7% of residents were under the age of 18; 7% were between the ages of 18 and 24; 21.7% were from 25 to 44; 26.6% were from 45 to 64; and 16% were 65 years of age or older. The gender makeup of the city was 50.4% male and 49.6% female.

2000 census
As of the census of 2000, there were 552 people, 202 households, and 167 families living in the city. The racial makeup of the city was 97.28% White, 0.72% African American, 1.27% Native American, 0.18% Asian, and 0.54% from two or more races. Hispanic or Latino of any race were 0.36% of the population.

There were 202 households, out of which 36.1% had children under the age of 18 living with them, 77.2% were married couples living together, 5.0% had a female householder with no husband present, and 17.3% were non-families. 13.9% of all households were made up of individuals, and 7.9% had someone living alone who was 65 years of age or older. The average household size was 2.73 and the average family size was 3.03.

In the city, the population was spread out, with 27.4% under the age of 18, 4.3% from 18 to 24, 25.4% from 25 to 44, 29.3% from 45 to 64, and 13.6% who were 65 years of age or older. The median age was 40 years. For every 100 females, there were 95.7 males. For every 100 females age 18 and over, there were 92.8 males.

The median income for a household in the city was $62,969, and the median income for a family was $67,292. Males had a median income of $42,308 versus $27,375 for females. The per capita income for the city was $21,857. About 1.1% of families and 2.3% of the population were below the poverty line, including none of those under the age of eighteen or sixty-five or over.

Education
The community is served by Jefferson West USD 340 public school district.

See also
 Perry Lake and Perry State Park
 Great Flood of 1951

References

Further reading

External links
 City of Ozawkie
 Ozawkie - Directory of Public Officials
 Ozawkie City Map, KDOT

Cities in Kansas
Cities in Jefferson County, Kansas
Topeka metropolitan area, Kansas